Walter R. Nord (born 1939) is an American academic specializing in the study of organizational behaviour. He has co-authored books on power in organizations and managing organizations.

Nord has published numerous scholarly articles in well respected journals such  as the Journal of Management, the Journal of Marketing and the Psychological Bulletin. He is currently the Professor of Organisational Behaviour at the University of South Florida.

Early life
Nord received a B.A. major in economics from Williams College in 1961. Nord then went on to receive an M.S. in organizational behaviour from Cornell University in 1963. He received his Ph.D. in social psychology from Washington University in St. Louis in 1967.

Career
Nord started his career as an assistant professor of organizational psychology at Washington University from 1967. He was promoted to professor of organizational psychology in 1974 and continued to be employed by Washington University until 1989.

In 1989, Nord became the professor of organizational behaviour in the College of Business for the University of South Florida.

References

1939 births
Living people
Cornell University alumni
University of South Florida faculty
Washington University in St. Louis faculty
Washington University in St. Louis alumni
Williams College alumni